Apache Attic is a project of Apache Software Foundation to provide processes to make it clear when an Apache project has reached its end-of-life. The Attic project was created in November 2008. Also the retired projects can be retained.

Projects may not stay in the attic forever: e.g. Apache XMLBeans is now a project of Apache Poi, but was previously in the attic from July 2013 until June 2018.

Sub-Projects 
This is a (non-exhaustive) list of Apache Attic projects:

 Avalon: Apache Avalon was a computer software framework to provide a reusable component framework for container (server) applications.
 Apex: Apache Apex was a YARN-native platform that unified stream and batch processing.
 AxKit: Apache AxKit was an XML Apache publishing framework run by the Apache foundation written in Perl.
 Beehive: Apache Beehive is a Java Application Framework designed to make the development of Java EE based applications quicker and easier.
 C++ Standard Library: A set of classes and functions, which are written in the core language (code name stdcxx).
 Click: Apache Click is a page- and component-oriented web application framework for Java EE and is built on top of the Java Servlet API.
 Crimson: Crimson is a Java XML parser which supports XML 1.0 through Java API for XML Processing (JAXP) 1.1,SAX 2.0, SAX2 Extensions version 1.0 and DOM Level 2 Core Recommendation.
 Excalibur: Apache Excalibur project produces a set of libraries for component based programming in the Java language.
 Harmony: Apache Harmony was an open source, free Java implementation.
 HiveMind: Apache HiveMind was a top level software project, for a framework written in Java. It takes the form of a services and configuration microkernel.
 iBATIS: iBATIS is a persistence framework which automates the mapping between SQL databases and objects in Java, .NET, and Ruby on Rails.
 Jakarta: The Jakarta Project created and maintained open source software for the Java platform.
 Cactus: Cactus was a simple test framework for unit testing server-side Java code (Servlets, EJBs, Tag libs, ...) from the Jakarta Project.
 ECS: ECS (Element Construction Set) was a Java API for generating elements for any of a variety of markup languages like HTML 4.0 and XML.
 ORO: ORO was a set of text-processing Java classes that provide Perl5 compatible regular expressions, AWK-like regular expressions, glob expressions, and utility classes for performing substitutions, splits, filtering filenames, etc.
 Regexp: Regexp was a  pure Java Regular Expression package.
 Slide: Slide is an open-source content management system from the Jakarta project. It is written in Java and implements the WebDAV protocol.
 Taglibs: Taglibs was a large collection of JSP Tag Libraries.
 ODE: ODE was a Java-based workflow engine to manage business processes which have been expressed in the Web Services Business Process Execution Language (WS-BPEL).
 Ojb: Apache ObJectRelationalBridge (OJB) is an Object/Relational mapping tool that allows transparent persistence for Java Objects against relational databases.
 Quetzalcoatl: Quetzalcoatl was a project charged with the creation and maintenance of open-source software related to mod_python and the Python programming language.
 Shale: Shale is a web application framework which fundamentally based on JavaServer Faces.
 Shindig: Shindig is an OpenSocial container. It provides the code to render gadgets, proxy requests, and handle REST and RPC requests.
 Stratos: Stratos was a highly-extensible Platform-as-a-Service (PaaS) framework that helped run Apache Tomcat, PHP, and MySQL applications, and could be extended to support many more environments on all major cloud infrastructures.
 Xang: Apache Xang was an XML Web Framework that aggregated multiple data sources, made that data URL addressable and defined custom methods to access that data.
 Xindice: Apache Xindice was a native XML database.
 Wink: Apache Wink is an open source framework that enables development and consumption of REST style web services.

References

External links 
 Home Page

Apache Software Foundation projects